Romes Gainetdinov (born 6 May 1967 in Sverdlovsk) is a Russian former road racing cyclist.

Major results

1988
 2nd Overall Hessen Rundfahrt
1989
 1st Duo Normand (with Pavel Tonkov)
 3rd Overall Tour du Poitou-Charentes
1991
 8th Giro dell'Emilia
1992
 1st Stage 15 Volta a Portugal
 3rd Overall Circuito Montañés
1993
 3rd Clásica de Almería
1994
 1st  National Road Race Championships
1995
 1st Overall Grande Prémio Abimota
 6th Subida al Naranco

Grand Tour general classification results timeline

References

1967 births
Living people
Russian male cyclists